Charlotte "Charlie"  Guest (born 30 December 1993) is a Scottish World Cup alpine ski racer who specialises in slalom and competes occasionally in giant slalom. She is the first British woman ever to win an Alpine European Cup race.

Career

Early career 
Born in Edinburgh, Scotland, Guest started skiing at the age of 3 on the slopes of Cairngorm in the Scottish Highlands near her grandmother’s home in Nethy Bridge. Guest trained there with the Scottish Ski Club until she joined the British Ski Academy in France at 11. At age 14, she became the first British girl to win an international children’s race, before moving into FIS racing as part of the Scottish Alpine Ski Team.

Adult career 
Guest made her slalom World Cup debut in 2013 at Flachau, Austria.

At the end of 2014, she broke her spine in a skiing accident in Sweden, but by February 2016 had re-entered the top 100 rankings.

In the FIS Alpine World Ski Championships 2015, Guest finished 32 in the slalom and 43 in the giant slalom just 11 weeks after breaking four vertebrae.

In January 2018, Guest was selected to participate in the 2018 Winter Olympics.  She placed 33 in the slalom and reached the quarterfinals of the inaugural mixed team event.

She was again selected to compete in the FIS Alpine World Ski Championships 2019 after missing the 2017 Championships with a broken hand, where she achieved Britain's best female performance with a 24th in the Slalom.

Guest broke records as a British skier in 2019, becoming the first British woman ever to win an Alpine European Cup race. She went on again to win in Hasliberg, Switzerland, in January 2020.

In 2019, Guest began studying for a BSc in Psychology at The University of Aberdeen.

December 2019 saw Guest secure her first FIS Alpine World Cup points in St. Moritz, Switzerland, after qualifying in joint 12th place in the Parallel Slalom event but going out in the first knockout round to finish 29th.

World Cup results

Season standings

Olympic Results

References

External links
 

1993 births
Living people
People educated at the High School of Dundee
People educated at Strathallan School
Scottish female alpine skiers
Olympic alpine skiers of Great Britain
Alpine skiers at the 2018 Winter Olympics
Alpine skiers at the 2022 Winter Olympics
Sportspeople from Perth, Scotland
Alumni of the University of Aberdeen